Sre Ambel is a town in Koh Kong Province in south-western Cambodia. It is located along National Highway 4 and is 138 kilometres from Koh Kong (city).

References

Towns in Cambodia
Populated places in Koh Kong province